Middle Road is a street in the southern part of Tsim Sha Tsui, Kowloon, Hong Kong.

The street runs from Kowloon Park Drive in the west to the entrance of East Tsim Sha Tsui station in the east, where it makes a 90-degree turn to the south, terminating at Salisbury Road. Part of Middle Road marks the original coastline of Tsim Sha Tsui prior to land reclamation. A subway runs underneath the east-west segment of the street, forming an important pedestrian artery in the district.

History
Constructed in the late 19th century, Middle Road formerly ran along the coastline between Blackhead Point and the hill where the Former Marine Police Headquarters Compound stands. Middle Road roughly aligns with the original concave coastline between these two promontories, where once there was a beach. The bay was reclaimed for the construction of the former Kowloon station of the Kowloon–Canton Railway while the Peninsula Hotel was built on the reclamation between Kowloon station and Middle Road.

In 1929, construction of the Middle Road Children's Playground began at the eastern end of Middle Road as part of a wider suite of public works improvements in the area. This site remains a playground to this day. It was entirely rebuilt in the early 1980s by the Urban Council in tandem with the development of New World Centre across Salisbury Road. It was demolished after the site was taken over by KCR Corporation in 2001 for the construction of East Tsim Sha Tsui station beneath it, but the playground was reprovisioned over the station and reopened on 9 May 2005.

The eastern end of Middle Road was once dominated by the 10-storey Middle Road Multi-storey Car Park, which upon opening on 11January 1965 was the largest multi-storey car park in Hong Kong. The car park stood directly over part of Middle Road, and was home to the Yau Tsim District Office before Yau Tsim and Mong Kok districts merged. In 2014, the government put the site, which was rezoned for commercial use, up for auction. The car park ceased operation in July 2014. In September 2014, it was announced that developer Henderson Land had won the site with a HK$4.7-billion bid. Henderson Land built a commercial tower called "H Zentre", which unlike the old car park is not built overtop of Middle Road.

The section of road beneath the Middle Road car park was originally unnamed. In May 1987, the Urban Council (then responsible for street naming) decided to treat it as a southward extension of Middle Road, thus applying the same name to it.

In the early 2000s, the Kowloon-Canton Railway was extended to a new terminus, East Tsim Sha Tsui station. To link this new station with the existing Tsim Sha Tsui station of the MTR, an extensive pedestrian subway network was built in the area. A 250-metre-long section of subway was built beneath Middle Road, spanning between the new KCR station and the Kowloon Hotel. This subway was later extended further down Middle Road to Kowloon Park Drive, where it connected to two existing government-owned subways. Today, this subway – which runs the entire east-west length of Middle Road – forms a major underground pedestrian artery.

Features
Landmarks and adjoining roads, from West to East:
 > Junction with Kowloon Park Drive
 > Junction with Ashley Road
 The Salisbury YMCA of Hong Kong. At the corner of Middle Road and Kowloon Park Drive
 > Junction with Hankow Road
 Kowloon Hotel. At the corner of Middle Road (north side) and Nathan Road
 East Tsim Sha Tsui station. Exit L4
 The Peninsula Hong Kong. At the corner of Middle Road (south side) and Nathan Road
 East Tsim Sha Tsui station. Exit L3
 > Junction with Nathan Road
 26 Nathan Road. A commercial building at the corner of Middle Road (north side) and Nathan Road
 Sheraton Hong Kong Hotel & Towers. At the corner of Middle Road (south side) and Nathan Road
 Hermes House. A commercial building
 East Tsim Sha Tsui station. Exit L1
 H Zentre. A commercial building at the former location of the Middle Road Multi-storey Car Park
 > Junction with Minden Row (footpath)
 Mariner's Club. At the Blackhead Point end of the street
 East Tsim Sha Tsui station. Exit K
 East Tsim Sha Tsui Station Public Transport Interchange
 Middle Road Children's Playground. Elevated, on a platform over the station
 > Junction with Salisbury Road

See also
 List of streets and roads in Hong Kong

References

Roads in Kowloon
Tsim Sha Tsui